Lukáš Hricov (born 28 January 1984) is a Slovak football forward who currently plays for 3. liga club 1.FK Svidník.

References

External links
 
 Ligy.sk profile
 
 Futbalnet profile

1984 births
Living people
Slovak footballers
Association football forwards
1. FC Tatran Prešov players
AS Trenčín players
MŠK Rimavská Sobota players
MŠK Novohrad Lučenec players
ŠK Futura Humenné players
Olimpia Elbląg players
ŠK Odeva Lipany players
FK Spišská Nová Ves players
MFK Tatran Liptovský Mikuláš players
Slovak Super Liga players
2. Liga (Slovakia) players
Expatriate footballers in Poland
Sportspeople from Prešov